In proof complexity, a Frege system is a propositional proof system whose proofs are sequences of formulas derived using a finite set of sound and implicationally complete inference rules. Frege systems (more often known as Hilbert systems in general proof theory) are named after Gottlob Frege.

Formal definition
Let K be a finite functionally complete set of Boolean connectives, and consider propositional formulas built from variables p0, p1, p2, ... using K-connectives. A Frege rule is an inference rule of the form

where B1, ..., Bn, B are formulas. If R is a finite set of Frege rules, then F = (K,R) defines a derivation system in the following way. If X is a set of formulas, and A is a formula, then an F-derivation of A from axioms X is a sequence of formulas A1, ..., Am such that Am = A, and every Ak is a member of X, or it is derived from some of the formulas Ai, i < k, by a substitution instance of a rule from R. An F-proof of a formula A is an F-derivation of A from the empty set of axioms (X=∅). F is called a Frege system if
F is sound: every F-provable formula is a tautology.
F is implicationally complete: for every formula A and a set of formulas X, if X entails A, then there is an F-derivation of A from X.
The length (number of lines) in a proof A1, ..., Am is m. The size of the proof is the total number of symbols.

A derivation system F as above is refutationally complete, if for every inconsistent set of formulas X, there is an F-derivation of a fixed contradiction from X.

Examples 
 Frege's propositional calculus is a Frege system.
 There are many examples of sound Frege rules on the Propositional calculus page.
 Resolution is not a Frege system because it only operates on clauses, not on formulas built in an arbitrary way by a functionally complete set of connectives. However, adding the weakening rule:  makes it implicationally complete. Resolution is also refutationally complete.

Properties 
Reckhow's theorem (1979) states that all Frege systems are p-equivalent.
 Natural deduction and sequent calculus (Gentzen system with cut) are also p-equivalent to Frege systems.
 There are polynomial-size Frege proofs of the pigeonhole principle (Buss 1987).
 Frege systems are considered to be fairly strong systems. Unlike, say, resolution, there are no known superlinear lower bounds on the number of lines in Frege proofs, and the best known lower bounds on the size of the proofs are quadratic.

Extended Frege system

An important extension of a Frege system, the so called Extended Frege, is defined by taking a Frege system F and adding an extra derivation rule which allows to derive formula , where  abbreviates its definition in the language of the particular F and the atom  does not occur in previously derived formulas including axioms and in the formula . 

The purpose of the new derivation rule is to introduce 'names' or shortcuts for arbitrary formulas. It allows to interpret proofs in Extended Frege as Frege proofs operating with circuits instead of formulas.

Cook's correspondence allows to interpret Extended Frege as a nonuniform equivalent of Cook's theory PV and Buss's theory  formalizing feasible (polynomial-time) reasoning.

References 
Krajíček, Jan (1995). "Bounded Arithmetic, Propositional Logic, and Complexity Theory", Cambridge University Press.

Buss, S. R. (1987). "Polynomial size proofs of the propositional pigeonhole principle", Journal of Symbolic Logic 52, pp. 916–927.
Pudlák, P., Buss, S. R. (1995). "How to lie without being (easily) convicted and the lengths of proofs in propositional calculus", in: Computer Science Logic'94 (Pacholski and Tiuryn eds.), Springer LNCS 933, 1995, pp. 151–162.

Propositional calculus
Logic in computer science